Jamie Ritchie (born 16 August 1996) is a Scotland international rugby union player who plays for Edinburgh Rugby in the United Rugby Championship.

Rugby Union career
Jamie Ritchie started his rugby career while being brought up in the city of Dundee. One of his idols is Dundee-born Andy Nicol.

Professional career

While still a teenager, Ritchie made his first-team debut in October 2014 with an appearance from the replacements' bench in the Pro12 match against Leinster. In January 2021, Ritchie signed the longest deal in Edinburgh's history, with head coach Richard Cockerill describing Ritchie as a future Scotland captain. "“Jamie is an excellent young player with an old head on his shoulders. He has a really bright future ahead of him and we’re delighted he’s signed such a long-term deal. His work-rate is immense but it’s the quality of work within that which sets him apart," Cockerill said.

International career

Ritchie has represented Scotland at under-16, under-18 and under-20. He played in the 2013 and 2014 European Under-18 Rugby Union Championship, the latter as captain. In June 2014 he played four matches for Scotland under-20 at the 2014 IRB Junior World Championship.

Ritchie received his first call up to the senior Scotland squad by coach Gregor Townsend in October 2017 
for the autumn internationals. Ritchie received his first senior cap against Canada on the 9 June 2018 in a 48–10 victory.

Ritchie was picked in Scotland's 2019 Rugby World Cup squad. However he fractured his cheekbone in the last warm-up match for Scotland against Georgia.

Ritchie received player of the match in Scotland's match against France in the 2020  Six Nations, after getting punched by France prop Mohamed Haouas During this game Mohamed Haouas was sent off for dangerous play in the 37th minute for punching Ritchie. He once again won a 2020 Six Nations player of the match award, this time against Wales in a 14–10 victory. It was Scotland's first win on Welsh soil since 2002.

In October 2022 Ritchie was named as the captain of the Scottish squad for the 2022 end-of-year rugby union internationals.

Other sports

Outside rugby, he was a silver medalist at the British judo championships in 2009, the British independent schools judo champion in 2010 and played first XI cricket at his school.

References

External links
 

Edinburgh Rugby - Jamie Ritchie

1996 births
Living people
Scottish rugby union players
People educated at Strathallan School
Edinburgh Rugby players
Rugby union players from Dundee
Scotland international rugby union players
Madras College FP players
Howe of Fife RFC players
Rugby union flankers
People educated at Madras College